Shooting Silvio is the album collecting the original music by Stefano Lentini composed for the film Shooting Silvio. It was written and composed during 2007 collaborating with Orchestra di Roma and many musicians and sound engineer. Mixed by Luciano Torani producer and sound engineer who worked with Italian singer Francesco De Gregori.

Track listing
"Il Buffone Animato" – 2:47
"Anthropology" – 2:37
"Dirindà" – 3:44
"One year ago I" – 3:25
"Jassa Dance" – 3:13
"Butterflies" – 3:15
"Intermezzo" – 2:12
"Il lato sabbioso della strada" – 4:09
"One year ago II" – 4:12

Personnel
Production
Stefano Lentini, and Luciano Torani assisted by Francesco Belmonte  — Recording, Kiwi Studio, Roma; Forward Studios, Grottaferrata (Roma)
 assisted by Cristiano Fini HRS (Roma) and Daniele Tortora (Vacuum Studio, Roma) — Additional recording,
Luciano Torani, Stefano Lentini — Mixing
Olga Tanferna — Production Management
Alessandra Principato, Barbara Anselmi — Production Coordinators
Valerio Calisse — Pro-Tools assistant
Danilo Rossi — Mastering
Performing Artists
Stefano Lentini — Guitars, Piano, Flute, Synth, Bass
Eleonora Vulpiani — Lyre-guitar
Pasquale Laino — Sax
Roberto Angelini — Vocal
Gabriele Lazzarotti — Bass
Fabio Rondanini — Drums
Orchestra di Roma — String Orchestra
Francesco Negroni — Director
Luca Peverini — Cello
Sequencing, Synthesizers, Sound Effects, Etc.
Stefano Lentini — "Everything Else"
Packaging
Sten — Poster
Alessio D'Amico — Photography
Stefano Lentini — Photography, Layout, Design, Illustrations

References

External links 

 
Stefano Lentini, composer official site

Stefano Lentini albums
Film soundtracks
2007 soundtrack albums